The 2007 NCAA men's volleyball tournament was the 38th annual tournament to determine the national champion of NCAA men's collegiate indoor volleyball. The single elimination tournament was played at St. John Arena in Columbus, Ohio during May 2007.

UC Irvine defeated IPFW in the final match, 3–1 (30–20, 24–30, 30–23, 30–28), to win their first national title. Both teams made their debut appearances in the title match. The Anteaters (29–5) were coached by John Speraw.

UC Irvine's Matt Webber was named the tournament's Most Outstanding Player. Webber, along with six other players, comprised the All Tournament Team.

Qualification
Until the creation of the NCAA Men's Division III Volleyball Championship in 2012, there was only a single national championship for men's volleyball. As such, all NCAA men's volleyball programs, whether from Division I, Division II, or Division III, were eligible. A total of 4 teams were invited to contest this championship.

Tournament bracket 
Site: St. John Arena, Columbus, Ohio

All tournament team 
Matt Webber, UC Irvine (Most outstanding player)
Jayson Jablonsky, UC Irvine
Brian Thornton, UC Irvine
David Smith, UC Irvine
C.J. Macias, IPFW
Colin Lundeen, IPFW
Paul Carroll, Pepperdine

See also 
 NCAA Men's National Collegiate Volleyball Championship
 NCAA Women's Volleyball Championships (Division I, Division II, Division III)

References

2007
NCAA Men's Volleyball Championship
NCAA Men's Volleyball Championship
2007 in sports in Ohio
Volleyball in Ohio